Justinas is a masculine Lithuanian given name, equivalent to Justin. Notable people with the name include:

Justinas Beržanskis (born 1989), Lithuanian steeplechase runner
Justinas Januševskij (born 1994), Lithuanian footballer
Justinas Kinderis (born 1987), Lithuanian modern pentathlete
Justinas Lagunavičius (1924–1997), Lithuanian basketball player
Justinas Marazas (born 2000), Lithuanian footballer
Justinas Marcinkevičius (1930–2011), Lithuanian poet and playwright
Justinas Pranaitis (1861–1917),  Lithuanian Catholic priest
Justinas Staugaitis (1866–1943), Lithuanian Roman Catholic bishop, politician, educator and writer
Justinas Usonis (born 1975), Lithuanian lawyer and legal scholar

Lithuanian masculine given names